María Elena Espeso (born 10 October 1972 in Valladolid) is a Spanish long-distance runner. She competed in the marathon at the 2012 Summer Olympics, placing 61st with a time of 2:36:12.

References

1972 births
Living people
Spanish female long-distance runners
Olympic athletes of Spain
Athletes (track and field) at the 2012 Summer Olympics
Sportspeople from Valladolid
20th-century Spanish women
21st-century Spanish women